The US Post Office - Flatbush Station is a historic post office building located at 2273 Church Avenue between Flatbush and Bedford Avenues in the Flatbush neighborhood of Brooklyn, New York City. It was built in 1936, and designed by consulting architect Lorimer Rich in the Colonial Revival style, for the Office of the Supervising Architect of the United States Department of the Treasury.  The building is a symmetrical, two-story, red brick building with a gable roof and a large one-story rear wing.

It was listed on the National Register of Historic Places in 1988.

See also
National Register of Historic Places listings in Kings County, New York

References
Notes

External links

FLATBUSH — Post Office (USPS Locator)

Flatbush
Government buildings completed in 1936
Colonial Revival architecture in New York City
Government buildings in Brooklyn
National Register of Historic Places in Brooklyn
1936 establishments in New York City